Lanleff is a commune in the Côtes-d'Armor department of Brittany in northwestern France.

Geography

Climate
Lanleff has a oceanic climate (Köppen climate classification Cfb).

Population

Inhabitants of Lanleff are called lanleffois in French.

See also
Communes of the Côtes-d'Armor department

References

External links

Communes of Côtes-d'Armor